= Tesseract Group, Inc. =

- Formerly: Education Alternatives, Inc
- Industry: Education
- Website: Archived site

Tesseract Group, Inc. (also stylized as TesseracT Group) was a for-profit education management organization (EMO) headquartered in Scottsdale, Arizona. It operated preschools, private schools, public charter schools, and a postsecondary business college, primarily in the 1990s. The company originated as Education Alternatives, Inc. (EAI) and rebranded in the late 1990s before filing for Chapter 11 bankruptcy in 2000 and winding down operations.

== History ==
The company originated in the late 1980s with a focus on alternative education models that prioritized individualized instruction. Its first Tesseract School opened in Eagan, Minnesota, in 1984. In 1988, Education Alternatives Inc. expanded to Arizona when the Paradise Valley Town Council approved a special-use permit for a new campus on a four-acre portion of the Foothills Tennis and Swim Club at the northeast corner of Doubletree Ranch Road and Tatum Boulevard. The planned facility aimed to serve approximately 300 students, including preschool programs for about 60 children ages 2½ to 6, and was developed in affiliation with Control Data Corp. The council approved the project by a 4-1 vote, with construction required to be completed by the end of 1988.

During the 1990s, EAI secured several high-profile contracts to manage public schools in districts including Baltimore, Maryland; Hartford, Connecticut; and Miami-Dade County, Florida. These initiatives generated significant attention for the emerging for-profit education management sector but encountered challenges related to performance and costs, leading to the non-renewal or termination of several agreements. In an effort to reposition itself, the company relocated its headquarters to Scottsdale, Arizona, and rebranded as Tesseract Group, Inc., around 1998. It then grew through acquisitions, notably Sunrise Educational Services Inc., which operated a chain of Arizona preschools and extended-care programs, and the Academy of Business Inc., a postsecondary institution offering business and computer training. At its height, Tesseract Group oversaw approximately 37 schools and programs serving 5,000 to 8,000 students across several states, with a concentration in Arizona.

=== Operations ===
Tesseract Group provided integrated educational services across multiple levels. Its private TesseracT Schools emphasized student-centered, multi-sensory learning environments, often serving students from early childhood through middle school. The Sunrise subsidiary focused on preschool and before- and after-school programs, primarily in Arizona, while also supporting some charter school operations. The company additionally managed public charter schools in states including Arizona and operated the Academy of Business College for adult postsecondary training.

Facilities were known for extended operating hours and a focus on individualized instruction. One notable example was the Paradise Valley campus, which evolved into an independent nonprofit institution that continues to operate today.

=== Decline and Bankruptcy ===
By early 2000, Tesseract faced severe financial strain. In February of that year, interim CEO Martha Taylor Thomas and CFO Richard Yonker resigned, citing disagreement with the company’s direction. The firm warned of likely delisting from Nasdaq on February 10 unless additional financing was secured. It reported a first-quarter loss of $3.4 million and described its cash position as “extremely tight,” despite staff reductions and office downsizing. The company indicated it needed new capital to maintain school operations and had restructured leases to resolve defaults at four Arizona sites.

Later that year, Tesseract sold additional assets, including charter schools and the Academy of Business College. On October 6, 2000, Tesseract Group Inc. and Sunrise Educational Services filed for Chapter 11 bankruptcy protection in Arizona. During the proceedings, remaining assets were divested, and certain schools transitioned to nonprofit entities, such as Tesseract of Eagan, Inc.
